Elizabeth Pulman née Chadd (1 August 1836 – 3 February 1900) was a British-born New Zealand photographer. She was regarded as being the country's first female professional photographer.

Biography
Pulman was born in Lymm, Cheshire, England in 1836, and arrived in New Zealand in 1861. 

She owned a photographic studio in Auckland along with her husband George Pulman that was opened in 1867. George Pulman died in 1871 and Elizabeth continued the business on her own.

Pulman raised nine children on her own after being widowed. 

Twice widowed, Pulman kept the studio afloat, specialising in scenic photographs and portraits.

Many of her works included important Maori tribe members including Chief Paul Paora Tuhaere, King Tawhiao, and Tawhiao's daughter and second wife. 

Pulman died on 3 February 1900 in Auckland, New Zealand.

References

External links

 Elizabeth Pulman Maori Portraits
 The Life of Elizabeth Pulman 

1836 births
1900 deaths
English emigrants to New Zealand
New Zealand photographers
New Zealand women photographers
19th-century New Zealand photographers
Pioneers of photography
19th-century women photographers
People from Lymm
Photographers from Auckland